Yellow Loveless is a tribute album featuring cover versions of the 11 songs from My Bloody Valentine's 1991 record Loveless. The album was released on January 23, 2013, by High Fader Records, coincidentally just after the announcement of My Bloody Valentine's third studio album, mbv (2013).

The album features exclusive covers by Japanese artists from various genres, including sludge metal band Boris, pop punk group Shonen Knife, and shoegaze band Tokyo Shoegazer.

Track listing

References

External links
 

Tribute albums
2013 compilation albums
Compilation albums by Japanese artists
My Bloody Valentine (band)
Shoegaze compilation albums